Lise Tréhot (14 March 1848 – 12 March 1922) was a French art model who posed for artist Pierre-Auguste Renoir from 1866 until 1872, during his early Salon period.  She appeared in more than twenty paintings, including notable works such as Lise with a Parasol (1867) and In Summer (1868), and she was the model for almost all of Renoir's work featuring female figures at this time. Tréhot married Georges Brière de l'Isle in 1883 and raised four children to whom she bequeathed two of Renoir's paintings, Lise Sewing (1867–68) and Lise in a White Shawl (1872), both of which are currently held by the Dallas Museum of Art.

Early life

Lise Tréhot was born in Ecquevilly, Seine-et-Oise, France, on 14 March 1848, to Louis Tréhot and Amelie Elisabeth Boudin.  Her father was the postmaster of the town until the mid-1850s, after which he moved the entire family to Paris where he sold lemonade and tobacco.  She was the fourth in a family of six children, including three brothers and two sisters. A document from this time describes Tréhot's profession as a dressmaker. Clémence Tréhot, her older sister, was the lover of artist Jules Le Coeur, who later introduced her to Pierre-Auguste Renoir at his house in Marlotte, possibly in June 1865.

Modeling period

Tréhot began modeling for Renoir when she was about eighteen and he was twenty-five. Early paintings of Tréhot at this time include Lise in a Straw Hat (1866) and Lise Sewing (1867–68). Renoir is thought to have painted a modern nude of Tréhot as Diana (1867), but it was rejected by the Salon of 1867. Renoir found critical success the next year with Lise (1867), which was well received at the Salon of 1868.  The Impressionist painting depicts Tréhot in a life-size portrait, strolling through a wooded park as sunlight falls through the trees. Art critic Zacharie Astruc described Tréhot in Lise as "the likeable Parisian girl in the woods", and as a working-class girl. Émile Zola also approved, comparing Tréhot to Monet's model and later wife Camille Doncieux. French art critic Théodore Duret later observed that because Renoir's Lise was derivative of Gustave Courbet's technique,  its appearance at the Salon "provoked no definite opposition".  However, Renoir's decision to shadow Tréhot's face in darkness and emphasize the reflection of sunlight from her white dress in Lise led several critics to ridicule Tréhot's appearance due to the unusual contrast.

At the Salon of 1869, Tréhot appeared in a work named In Summer (1868), dressed casually in a loose blouse falling off her shoulders. John Collins notes that Tréhot's "dark, heavy-set and expressionless features" worked well in such portraits, but were less successful in more formal, costume-oriented paintings such as The Engaged Couple (1868), where she poses with artist Alfred Sisley.  In the summer of 1869, she accompanied Renoir to his parents’ house in the Ville-d'Avray, and made trips to the Seine near Bougival where Renoir painted scenes with Monet on the water.  La Barque (1870) is thought to depict Lise during this summer holiday.

In total, Tréhot appeared in over twenty paintings by Renoir during his early Salon period from approximately 1866 until 1872. According to art historian John House, "Lise was the model for virtually all of Renoir's female figures at this time".

Although little is known about the exact nature of Tréhot's relationship with Renoir while she was modeling; she is said to have given birth to a baby boy named Pierre on 14 December 1868, but it is unclear what became of him and he may have died as an infant. On 21 July 1870, Tréhot gave birth to a baby girl named Jeanne (d. 1934) who was given to a wet nurse to raise as her own. Renoir continued to secretly support Jeanne financially until he died (and after his death with the help of Ambroise Vollard), but never publicly or legally acknowledged that she was his daughter during his lifetime.

For unknown reasons, Tréhot stopped modeling for Renoir after 1872; it was said that she never spoke to or saw him again. Although Tréhot was an important part of Renoir's early career, he never mentioned her in any published interviews, memoirs, or biographies.

Later life

In 1883, more than a decade after Tréhot stopped modeling for Renoir, she married architect Georges Brière de l'Isle (1847–1902). As the wife of Brière de l'Isle, she raised two sons and two daughters. Tréhot bequeathed two of Renoir's paintings, Lise Sewing (1867–68) and Lise in a White Shawl (1872), to her children. It is said that before her death, she destroyed many of her personal papers related to her time modeling for Renoir.  Tréhot died in Paris on 12 March 1922, at the age of 73.  She is buried in the Père Lachaise Cemetery.

Selected works as model

Tréhot's list of selected works includes at least twenty-six oil on canvas paintings, twenty-four of which were painted by Renoir, while two are by Frédéric Bazille (1841–1870). It is thought that Tréhot may have posed for as many as twenty-three works for Renoir, but only once for Bazille; Renoir's Landscape with Two People (1866), in which she appeared, has survived only as a fragment of the lower left corner, known as Woman with Bird (La Fille a l'Oaseau). Landscape with Two People is preserved as a painting within a painting in  Bazille's Studio (1870), the only known surviving image of the full painting. Tréhot is believed to have posed for La Toilette (1869–70), another work by Bazille. At least one painting, Diana (1867), is disputed, and is thought to feature a model other than Tréhot.

See also
List of paintings by Pierre-Auguste Renoir

Notes

References

Further reading
Gélineau, Jean-Claude (2007). Jeanne Tréhot: La fille cachée de Pierre Auguste Renoir.  Essoyes. . .
Le Cœur, Marc (2002). "O pintor, o primeiro modelo e seus primeiros admiradores: A historía que Renoir não mencionava" [Le peintre, son premier modèle et ses premiers amateurs: l'histoire dont Renoir ne voulait pas parler], Renoir: O Pintor da Vida, São Paulo, MASP, p. 33–65 (in Portuguese), 196–223 (in French) et 255–279 (in English)
Le Cœur, Marc (2009). Renoir au temps de la bohème. L'histoire que l'artiste voulait oublier, Paris, L’Échoppe. . .

External links

1848 births
1922 deaths
French artists' models
Pierre-Auguste Renoir
People from Yvelines